Castelo Branco is Portuguese for white castle, and may refer to:

People
 João Rodrigues de Castelo Branco, physician, better known as Amato Lusitano and Amatus Lusitanus (1511–1568)
 Camilo Castelo Branco (1825–1890), Portuguese writer
 Humberto de Alencar Castelo Branco (1897–1967), president of Brazil between 1964 and 1967
 Sérgio Tertuliano Castelo Branco, see List of Governors of São Paulo

Places

Brazil
 Castelo Branco (João Pessoa), a neighbourhood in the municipality of João Pessoa, State of Paraiba

Portugal
 Castelo Branco (district), a district in the Centro Region
 Castelo Branco Municipality, a municipality in the district of Castelo Branco
 Castelo Branco, Portugal, a city in the municipality of Castelo Branco
 Castelo Branco (Mogadouro), a civil parish in Mogadouro Municipality

In the archipelago of the Azores
 Castelo Branco (Horta), a civil parish in the municipality of Horta, island of Faial

Other
 Rodovia Castelo Branco (SP-280), a roadway in the State of São Paulo
 Castelo Branco cheese, a cheese named after the city of the same name in Portugal, the main city of the district where it is produced
 Clube Atlético Castelo Branco, a Brazilian football (soccer) club

See also
 Presidente Castelo Branco (disambiguation)